"We Sure Can Love Each Other" is a song recorded American country music artist Tammy Wynette. It was released in February 1971 as the only single from her album of the same name. The song peaked at number 2 on the Billboard Hot Country Singles chart. It also reached number 1 on the RPM Country Tracks chart in Canada. The song was written by Wynette, along with Billy Sherrill.

Chart performance

References

1971 singles
Tammy Wynette songs
Songs written by Billy Sherrill
Epic Records singles
Songs written by Tammy Wynette
1971 songs